Dr. Sudhir Chandra Sur Institute of Technology and Sports Complex, located in Kolkata. The college is owned by JIS Group, an educational conglomerate in Eastern India.This Institute, which was founded in 2009, is now well-known for its innovative and rigorous curriculum, which has produced experts in a variety of businesses and sectors in India and beyond.

Activities
Dr. Sudhir Chandra Sur Institute of Technology & Sports Complex, which has been known for its research culture and excellence in imparting Engineering, Science, and Management education for the past 12 years. The college arranges annual sports meet and tournaments.  Exhibitions are also  held. The Engineering College encourages both indoor and outdoor games.

References

External links
 JIS Group
 Dr. Sudhir Chandra Sur Institute of Technology and Sports Complex - official site

Engineering colleges in Kolkata
2009 establishments in West Bengal
Educational institutions established in 2009